Orthotylus  ochrotrichus is a species of bug from the Miridae family that can be found in European countries such as  France, Great Britain, Ireland, Spain, and the Netherlands.

References

Insects described in 1864
Hemiptera of Europe
ochrotrichus